Gregory Errol Chamitoff (born 6 August 1962) is a Canadian-born American engineer and former NASA astronaut. He has been to space twice, spending 6 months aboard the ISS across Expedition 17 and 18 in 2008, and another 15 days as part of STS-134 in 2011. STS-134 was the last of Space Shuttle Endeavour which delivered the Alpha Magnetic Spectrometer and completed the US Orbital Segment.

In 2008, Chamitoff voted from outer space; he also conducted a live-from-space satellite chat with students attending school in London.

Early life and education
Chamitoff was born 6 August 1962 in Montreal, Quebec, Canada to a Jewish family of Russian origin. He was inspired to become an astronaut after watching the moon landing at the age of six.

His education includes:
Blackford High School, San Jose, California, 1980.
B.S., Electrical Engineering, California Polytechnic State University, 1984.
M.S., Aeronautical Engineering, California Institute of Technology, 1985.
Ph.D., Aeronautics and Astronautics, Massachusetts Institute of Technology, 1992.
M.S., Physical Sciences (Space Science), University of Houston–Clear Lake, 2002.

Early career
As an undergraduate student at Cal Poly, Chamitoff taught lab courses in circuit design and worked summer internships at Four Phase Systems, Atari Computers, Northern Telecom, and IBM. He developed a self-guided robot for his undergraduate thesis project.  While at MIT and Draper Labs (1985–1992), Chamitoff worked on several NASA projects. He performed stability analyses for the deployment of the Hubble Space Telescope, designed flight control upgrades for the Space Shuttle autopilot, and worked on the attitude control system for Space Station Freedom. His doctoral thesis developed a new approach for robust intelligent flight control of hypersonic vehicles.

From 1993 to 1995, Chamitoff was a visiting professor at the University of Sydney, Australia, where he led a research group in the development of autonomous flight vehicles, and taught courses in flight dynamics and control. He has published numerous papers on aircraft and spacecraft guidance and control, trajectory optimization, and Mars mission design.

NASA career
In 1995, Chamitoff joined the Motion Control Systems Group in the Mission Operations Directorate at the Johnson Space Center, where he developed software applications for spacecraft attitude control monitoring, prediction, analysis, and maneuver optimization.

Selected by NASA for the Astronaut Class of 1998, Chamitoff started training in August 1998 and qualified for flight assignment as a mission specialist in 2000. He worked in the Space Station Robotics branch, was lead CAPCOM for ISS Expedition 9, acted as crew support astronaut for ISS Expedition 6, and helped develop onboard procedures and displays for Space Station system operations.

In July 2002, Chamitoff was a crew-member on the Aquarius undersea research habitat for 9 days as part of the NEEMO 3 mission (NASA Extreme Environment Mission Operations).

He served as the backup Expedition 15/16 Flight Engineer 2 and STS-117/STS-120 Mission Specialist 5 for Clayton Anderson.

While aboard the space shuttle, he spoke with Michael Sobell Sinai School students via a live satellite link.

Expedition 17 & 18

Chamitoff served on a long-duration mission to the International Space Station. He launched as a mission specialist on board Space Shuttle mission STS-124. He was flight engineer 2 and science officer on Expedition 17. He returned home as a mission specialist on STS-126, completing a tour that lasted six months.

As part of his personal allowance, Chamitoff brought the first bagels into space, 3 bags (18 sesame seed bagels) of Fairmount Bagels with him, from his cousin's bagel bakery. He also bought a velcro chess set and started playing games against mission control, which got quite competitive. Chamitoff also placed a Mezuzah shaped like a rocket made by British-Israeli silversmith Laura Cowan "on the door post near his bunk bed" on the International Space Station.

While Richard Garriott was aboard the ISS at the beginning of Expedition 18, Chamitoff and Garriott filmed the first magic show in space, and along with Yury Lonchakov, Michael Fincke and Richard Garriott, filmed a science-fiction movie made in space, Apogee of Fear.

After conducting experiments with the SPHERES during his mission, he founded the Zero Robotics competition, where high school students program the robots.

STS-134
Chamitoff served as a mission specialist on STS-134, the penultimate Space Shuttle mission, during which he made two spacewalks, the last of which completed the construction of the ISS.

Gallery

Post NASA Career
Chamitoff is currently the Lawrence Hargrave Professor of Aeronautical Engineering at the University of Sydney, Australia and a Professor of Engineering Practice in the Aerospace Engineering Department at Texas A&M University in College Station, Texas. He instructs senior design, human spaceflight operations, and dynamics and controls for aerospace vehicles.

Awards and honors

Chamitoff has received the following honors and awards:
California Astronaut Hall of Fame
NASA Distinguished Service Medal
NASA Exceptional Service Medal
NASA Space Flight Medal
Honored Alumnus CalPoly
AIAA Associate Fellow
AIAA Technical Excellence Award
NASA Silver Snoopy award
NASA/USA Space Flight Awareness Award
C.S. Draper Laboratory Graduate Fellowship
IEEE Graduate Fellowship
Tau Beta Pi Honor Society Fellowship
Phi Kappa Phi Honor Society
Eta Kappa Nu Honor Society
Applied Magnetics Scholarships
Academic Excellence Award
Most Outstanding Senior Award
Degree of Excellence and California Statewide Speech Finalist
Eagle Scout.

Personal life
Chamitoff is married to Alison Chantal Caviness, M.D., M.P.H., Ph.D. They have two children, Natasha and Dimitri. 

Chamitoff's recreational interests include scuba diving, backpacking, flying, skiing, racquetball, Aikido, juggling, magic and guitar. He is a certified divemaster and instrument rated pilot.  Chamitoff also enjoys chess and has played games with people on earth while living in the ISS.

References

External links 
 
Chamitoff interview
Space Station Expedition 17
Spacefacts biography of Gregory Chamitoff

1962 births
Living people
American people of Jewish descent
American people of Russian-Jewish descent
Anglophone Quebec people
Aquanauts
Canadian emigrants to the United States
Canadian people of Russian-Jewish descent
California Institute of Technology alumni
California Polytechnic State University alumni
Crew members of the International Space Station
MIT School of Engineering alumni
Scientists from Montreal
University of Houston–Clear Lake alumni
NASA civilian astronauts
Space Shuttle program astronauts
Jews from Quebec
Spacewalkers